The Gov. Arthur J. Weaver House is a historic house in Falls City, Nebraska. It was built in 1920 for Arthur J. Weaver, who served as the 22nd governor of Nebraska from 1929 to 1931. It was designed in the Queen Anne and Stick/eastlake architectural styles. It has been listed on the National Register of Historic Places since April 27, 2005.

References

External links

National Register of Historic Places in Richardson County, Nebraska
Queen Anne architecture in Nebraska
Stick-Eastlake architecture in the United States
Houses completed in 1920